The 1956 Toledo Rockets football team was an American football team that represented Toledo University in the Mid-American Conference (MAC) during the 1956 NCAA University Division football season. In their first and only season under head coach Jack Morton, the Rockets compiled a 1–7–1 record (1–5 against MAC opponents), finished in seventh place in the MAC, and were outscored by their opponents by a combined total of 250 to 118.

The team's statistical leaders included Sam Tisci with 354 passing yards, Don Wright with 498 rushing yards, and Dan Howell with 218 receiving yards.

Schedule

References

Toledo
Toledo Rockets football seasons
Toledo Rockets football